Jenny Dolfen (born 1975) is a German illustrator and teacher.

She was born in Bremerhaven, and in 2001, she received a degree in English and Latin at the University of Cologne.  Dolfen lives near Aachen with her husband and her two children.

Dolfen has done artwork for several role-playing games, including Fuller Flippers' Quest Cards, Action Studios' Realms of Wonder, Final Sword Productions' The World of Erien and the German Das Schwarze Auge.

She is known for her fan art based on the works of J. R. R. Tolkien, chiefly The Silmarillion. Dolfen won the inaugural Tolkien Society award in the category "best artwork" in 2014, for her watercolour painting "Eärendil the Mariner".

Dolfen has made illustrations for George R. R. Martin's novel A Song of Ice and Fire, as documented in the 2005 book 
The Art of George R.R. Martin's A Song of Ice and Fire.

See also
Works inspired by J. R. R. Tolkien
Maedhros (features an illustration by Dolfen)

References

External links
Official site
Jenny Dolfen on  Elfwood, Epilogue, and Deviantart

1975 births
Living people
German illustrators
German contemporary artists
Tolkien artists
German women illustrators
People from Bremerhaven